Goslar is a district in Lower Saxony, Germany. It is bounded by (from the south and clockwise) the districts of Göttingen, Northeim, Hildesheim and Wolfenbüttel, the city of Salzgitter, and by the states of Saxony-Anhalt (district of Harz) and Thuringia (Nordhausen).

History
The history of the district is linked with the city of Goslar. The district of Goslar was established in the 19th century by the Prussian government. The city of Goslar did not belong to the district until 1972, when it was eventually incorporated into the district. Langelsheim merged 1 November 2021 with the three municipalities of the Samtgemeinde Lutter am Barenberge, which was abolished.

Geography
The region comprises the northwestern part of the Harz mountains. The Harz National Park is part of this district. The highest peak is the Wurmberg (971 m) near Braunlage, also being the highest elevation of Lower Saxony. Above the small town of Altenau there is the source of the Oker river, which runs through the picturesque Oker valley to leave the Harz at Vienenburg.

Coat of arms
The eagle is the heraldic animal of the city of Goslar, while the lion symbolises the municipality of Schladen. Schladen is not part of the district, but the lords of Schladen ruled over major parts of the district in the early Middle Ages.

Towns and municipalities
The district of Goslar consists of the following towns and municipalities:

Transport 
 Road
Several federal highways cross the rural district of Goslar. These include the B 4, B 6, B 6n, B 82, B 241, B 242 and B 498.
The district roads (Kreisstraßen) are:

 Rail
The territory of the present rural district was joined to the railway network via the Brunswick–Bad Harzburg railway as early as 1840. In 1856 the Brunswick–Kreiensen railway via Seesen was built and, in 1866, the Vienenburg–Goslar railway followed; both branching off the original line. In 1875, the Hildesheim–Goslar railway and the former Halberstadt–Vienenburg railway (to 1945, today it has a new route along the Heudeber-Danstedt–Vienenburg railway) formed part of the link from Hanover via the North Harz to Halle (Saale). Later the lines from Seesen to Herzberg, Seesen to Goslar and Goslar to Bad Harzburg were added.

The railway line via Clausthal-Zellerfeld to Altenau (Innerste Valley Railway) and the railway branches to Braunlage (South Harz Railway) and St. Andreasberg (Oder Valley Railway) have since been dismantled. Even the Derneburg–Seesen branch line is out of service. The former route from Halberstadt via Wasserleben, Vienenburg and Grauhof to Langelsheim served east–west through trains until 1945 but has also since disappeared.

 Scheduled buses
Following the widespread closure of railways in the Harz the schedule bus services have gained great importance.

References

External links

 Official website (German)